When the Kellys Rode is a 1934 Australian film directed by Harry Southwell about Ned Kelly.

Plot
The story of Ned Kelly and his gang. A policeman comes to arrest Dan Kelly, which results in him being shot and Ned Kelly going on the run with his gang. They rob several banks but are captured and killed at the Glenrowan Hotel.

Cast

Hay Simpson (Leslie Hay-Simpson) as Ned Kelly
John Appleton as Dan Kelly
Norman Wait as Joe Byrne
Robert Inglis as Steve Hart
Regena Somerville as Kate Kelly

Production
The film was produced by Imperial Films which was incorporated in 1933 with a capital of £20,000.

Southwell had planned to call the film The Kelly Gang, but the Commonwealth censor objected to the use of the word gang in the title.

It was filmed on location in the Megalong Valley in the Blue Mountains and in Cinesound's Studio at Rushcutter's Bay. Southwell hired a crew from Cinesound Productions.

The film is considered to be first adaptation of the Kelly story with sound.

Release
The film was forbidden from being exhibited in New South Wales for more than ten years under the ban on bushranging films. The government thought that the film glorified bushrangers, and showed the police in a bad light. The filmmakers protested but were unsuccessful. However the movie was passed, with cuts, for screening in Victoria and other states.

Critical response was unenthusiastic. The film performed poorly at the box office and only returned £750 of which £500 went to the producers.

The ban was lifted in 1942 and the film was re-released in 1948.

Leslie Hay-Simpson, a Sydney solicitor, who played Ned Kelly, was later lost at sea between Lord Howe Island and Sydney. He had been on Lord Howe Island during October 1936, acting in Mystery Island, a Paramount Pictures film directed by J. A. Lipman.

References

External links
 When the Kellys Rode at IMDb
When the Kellys Rode at Oz Movies

Bushranger films
1934 films
Cultural depictions of Ned Kelly
Films shot in Australia
Australian black-and-white films
1934 Western (genre) films
Films directed by Harry Southwell